Royal Prussian Jagdstaffel 10 was a World War I "hunting group" (i.e., fighter squadron) of the Luftstreitkräfte, the air arm of the Imperial German Army during World War I. Jasta 10, in its brief existence, was credited with 118 enemy planes and 33 enemy observation balloons destroyed. In turn, it would lose twenty killed in action, another killed in a flying accident, ten wounded in action, and four held as prisoners of war.

History
Royal Prussian Jagdstaffel 10 was founded from the pre-existing KEK 3 on 28 September 1916 at Phalempin. It was promptly dubbed "Jagdstaffel Linck", after its original commanding officer.

Commanding Officers (Staffelführer)
 Ludwig Linck: 21 September 1916 – 22 October 1916
 Karl Rummelspacher: 23 October 1916 – 18 June 1917
 Albert Dossenbach: 24 June 1917 – 3 July 1917
 Ernst Freiherr von Althaus: 6 July 1917 – 30 July 1917
 Werner Voss: 30 July 1917 – 23 September 1917
 Ernst Weigand: 24 September 1917 – 25 September 1917
 Max Kühn (Acting): 26 September 1917 – 27 September 1917
 Hans Klein: 27 September 1917 – 19 February 1918
 Hans Weiss (Acting): 27 March 1918 – 1 April 1918
 Erich Löwenhardt (Acting): 1 April 1918 – 19 June 1918
 Alois Heldmann (Acting): 19 June 1918 – 6 July 1918
 Erich Löwenhardt: 6 July 1918 – 10 August 1918
 Alois Heldmann (Acting): 10 August 1918 – 14 August 1918
 Arthur Laumann: 14 August 1918 – 11 November 1918

Duty stations (airfields)
 Phalempin: 28 September 1916 – 27 October 1916
 Jametz, near Stenay: 28 October 1916 – 12 December 1916
 Angevillers: 12 December 1916 – Unknown
 Leffincourt: Unknown – 1 May 1917
 Bersée, Douai: 2 May 1917 – 24 May 1917
 Heule, Courtrai: 25 May 1917 – 2 July 1917
 Marckebeke: 2 July 1917 – 21 November 1917
 Iwuy: 21 November 1917 – 20 March 1918
 Awoingt: 20 March 1918 – 27 March 1918
 Léchelle, Pas-de-Calais: 27 March 1918 – 3 April 1918
 Harbonnières: 3 April 1918 – 12 April 1918
 Cappy: 12 April 1918 – 13 April 1918
 Lomme: 14 April 1918 – 21 May 1918
 Etreux, Guise: 21 May 1918 – 26 May 1918
 Puisieux-et-Clanlieu: 26 May 1918 – 31 May 1918
 Rugny Ferme, Beugneux: 31 May 1918 – 18 July 1918
 Monthussart Ferme: 18 July 1918 – 29 July 1918
 Puisieux-et-Clanlieu: 29 July 1918 – 10 August 1918
 Ennemain, Falvy: 10 August 1918 – 11 August 1918
 Bernes: 12 August 1918 – 30 August 1918
 Escaufourt: 30 August 1918 – 20 September 1918
 Metz-Frescaty: 25 September 1918 – 8 October 1918
 Marville: 9 October 1918 – 6 November 1918
 Tellancourt: 7 November 1918 – 11 November 1918

Notable personnel
Jasta 10 had thirteen aces serve in its ranks. Many of its commanding officers were notable aces, such as Althaus, Dossenbach, Heldmann, Klein, Laumann, Löwenhardt, Voss, and Weiss, but there were also noteworthy aces within the squadron who did not rise to its command, such as Paul Aue, Friedrich Friedrichs, Justus Grassmann, and Friedrich Schumacher.

Aircraft and operations
Original equipment upon foundation was four Fokker E.IVs, Albatros D.IIs, Albatros D.IIIs, two Fokker D.IIs and a Halberstadt D.II. Later in the war, during the Summer of 1918, the unit operated Albatros D.Vs, Pfalz D.IIIs, Fokker D.VIIs, Fokker Dr.I triplanes, and a few Fokker D.VIIIs. The triplanes often had their cowlings painted black, with white facing.

The jasta's first victory was by Paul Aue on 25 March 1917, as it began its support of 5th Armee. Jasta 10 moved to support of 4 Armee in early 1917, near Courtrai. In June 1917, Jasta 10 joined the Flying Circus, with Jasta 4, Jasta 6, and Jasta 11 forming the new fighter wing. The Jasta supported various armies on several fronts as the tempo of the war increased.

Jasta 10 was disbanded after the end of the war.

References

Bibliography
 

10
Military units and formations established in 1916
Military units and formations disestablished in 1918
1916 establishments in Germany